Shemiah LeGrande (born September 16, 1986) is a former American football defensive tackle. He was signed as an undrafted free agent by the Detroit Lions in 2008. He played college football at Hofstra.

He has also been a member of the Arizona Cardinals, Bloomington Extreme and Hartford Colonials.

Detroit Lions
On May 29, the Detroit Lions signed Shemiah LeGrande as an undrafted free agent.  On June 24, he was placed on injured reserve.

Arizona Cardinals
In 2009, LeGrande spent training camp with the Arizona Cardinals.  Ultimately, he was cut before the regular season started.

Bloomington Extreme
On December 1, 2009, the Bloomington Extreme announced that they had signed LeGrande for the 2010 season.

External links
Detroit Lions bio

1986 births
Living people
Sportspeople from Staten Island
Players of American football from New York City
American football defensive tackles
Detroit Lions players
Arizona Cardinals players
Hartford Colonials players
Curtis High School alumni